The 23rd Arizona State Legislature, consisting of the Arizona State Senate and the Arizona House of Representatives, was constituted in Phoenix from January 1, 1957, to December 31, 1958, during the second of two terms of Ernest McFarland's time as Governor of Arizona. The number of senators remained constant at two per county, totaling 28, while the number of members of the House of Representatives decreased from 81 to 80. The balance in the upper house continued at a 26–2 margin in favor of the Democrats. In the House, the Republicans picked up three seats, while Democrats lost four seats, however the Democrats still held a 57–23 edge.

Sessions
The Legislature met for two regular sessions at the State Capitol in Phoenix. The first opened on January 14, 1957, and adjourned on March 15, while the second convened on January 13, 1958, and adjourned on March 15. There was a single special session, which convened on March 19, 1958, and adjourned sine die on April 2.

State Senate

Members

The asterisk (*) denotes members of the previous Legislature who continued in office as members of this Legislature.

House of Representatives

Members 
The asterisk (*) denotes members of the previous Legislature who continued in office as members of this Legislature.

References

Arizona legislative sessions
1957 in Arizona
1958 in Arizona
1957 U.S. legislative sessions
1958 U.S. legislative sessions